David Schmidt may refer to:

Dave Schmidt (politician)
Dave Schmidt (catcher)
Dave Schmidt (pitcher)
David Schmidt (handballer)

See also
David Schmidtz, philosopher
David P. Schmitt, psychologist